Edwin Bakker (born 20 October 1967)  is head of the  knowledge and research department of the Netherlands Police Academy and professor of Terrorism Studies at Leiden University.

Biography
Bakker was born on 20 October 1967 in Leiden, in the Netherlands.

In 1997, Bakker obtained a PhD degree with his thesis on minority conflicts in Slovakia and Hungary. He graduated from Groningen University, where he studied Economic Geography.

Before joining the Police Academy he was the director of the Centre for Terrorism and Counterterrorism (CTC) of Leiden University Campus The Hague, and director of the Institute of Security and Global Affairs.

From 2007 to 2011, Bakker was a fellow at the Netherlands Institute of International Relations ‘Clingendael’. He was head of the Security and Conflict Programme.

Current roles
Bakker is head of the knowledge and research department of the Netherlands Police Academy and professor of Terrorism Studies at the  Leiden University.

He is also a member of the editorial board of several journals, including the Journal of Strategic Security, and Internationale Spectator.

He  is the lead instructor of the MOOC " Terrorism and Counterterrorism: Comparing Theory and Practice" on Coursera. and guest lecturer at the  joint training institute of the Dutch judicial system and the Public Prosecution Service, SSR (Studiecentrum Rechtspleging), the Institute for Safety (the Instituut Fysieke Veiligheid, or IFV), as well as Leiden University's Centre for Professional Learning.

Bakker’s research interests include radicalisation and jihadi terrorism, characteristics of (jihadi) terrorists dealing with (fear of) terrorism and its policy implications, security issues in general, as well as the world of policing.

Selected publications 

Key publications include:
 
 
 
 Rethinking European Security, Principles & Practice. Special issue of Security and Human Rights, Leiden, Martinus Nijhoff Publishers, vol. 21, 2010, no. 1, [with Arie Bloed, Sabine Machl and Wolfgang Zellner]
 Preventing Lone Wolf Terrorism: some CR Approaches Addressed, Perspectives of Terrorism, Vol. V, 2011, no. 5-6 [with Beatrice de Graaf].
 The Muslim Brotherhood in Europe. The challenge of transnationalization, London: Hurst Publishers, 2012, [with Roel Meijer]
  Terrorism and Counterterrorism Studies: Comparing Theory and Practice. Leiden: Leiden UP, 2015

References

External links 
 CTC
 Staff - ICCT
 Coursera instructor

1967 births
Living people
Dutch non-fiction writers
Experts on terrorism
Academic staff of Leiden University
People from Leiden